Uwe Brandl (born 27 October 1959 in Abensberg, Lower Bavaria) is a German politician, representative of the Christian Social Union of Bavaria.

He is a mayor of the city of Abensberg and has served as President of the Bayerischer Gemeindetag.

Awards and decorations
 1992: Badge of Honour of the Bundeswehr
 2005: Soldnermedaille (Bavaria)
 2007: Federal Cross of Merit
 2010: Bavarian Order of Merit
 2021: Federal Cross of Merit 1st class

Bibliography

 Kommunale Konzepte (2002) 
 Statusreport Neues Kommunales Rechnungswesen in Bayern (2003) 
 Praxiswissen für Kommunalpolitiker (2004)

See also
List of Bavarian Christian Social Union politicians

References

1959 births
Living people
People from Abensberg
Christian Social Union in Bavaria politicians
Officers Crosses of the Order of Merit of the Federal Republic of Germany
Recipients of the Badge of Honour of the Bundeswehr